Merna may refer to:
Merna (name)
 Merna, Illinois, an unincorporated community in the United States
 Merna, Nebraska, a village in the United States
 Merna Mora, a pastoral lease in Australia
 Miren (Italian: Merna), an urbanized settlement in Slovenia, on the border with Italy